Billie Jean Young (born 1947, died March 2021) was an actor, activist, poet and educator.  

She lived in Marion, Alabama from which she traveled the world to teach and work with young people.
She graduated from Judson College, and Samford University’s Cumberland School of Law.  She taught at Jackson State University. She has taught at Mississippi State University, Meridian campus.
She was Artist-in-Residence, at Judson College.
Her papers are held at the University of Alabama Hoole Special Collections Library.

Awards
1984 MacArthur Fellows Program
1995 Mississippi Governor's Award for Artistic Achievement 
1995 Lucy Terry Prince Unsung Heroine Award
2009 Southern Rural Black Women's Hall of Fame Award
2014 Black Belt Hall of Fame Award
2011 Girl Scouts of North Central Alabama Woman of Distinction Award

Works
"Fannie Lou Hamer: This Little Light", Mississippi Writers: Drama, Editor Dorothy Abbott, University Press of Mississippi, 1991, 
Fear Not The Fall, New South Books, 2004, 
Editor, Now How You Do, a memoir, 2009 Westry Wingate Press,  
Family Secrets, Westry Wingate Press, 2009,

References

External links
Author's website 
Conversations - (#622) Sonny Brewer; Billie Jean Young, Mississippi Public Television
www.youtube.com/watch?v=L7e452X_UAk Performing Fannie Lou Hamer: This Little Light...

1947 births
Judson College (Alabama) alumni
Samford University alumni
Jackson State University faculty
Mississippi State University faculty
MacArthur Fellows
Living people
People from Choctaw County, Alabama